Curt Ingvar Rafael Andersson (13 June 1937 – 4 June 2018) was a Swedish  sports shooter. He competed at the 1972 Summer Olympics and the 1976 Summer Olympics.

References

External links
 

1937 births
2018 deaths
Swedish male sport shooters
Olympic shooters of Sweden
Shooters at the 1972 Summer Olympics
Shooters at the 1976 Summer Olympics
People from Raseborg
20th-century Swedish people
21st-century Swedish people